Umesh Kulkarni may refer to:
Umesh Kulkarni (cricketer) (born 1942), Indian cricketer
Umesh Vinayak Kulkarni, Marathi film director